The 20/25TP (20-tonne Polish/25-tonne Polish) was a Polish medium tank concept that was never built. There were three projects designed by KSUS and BBTBr.Panc. and PZInż which even managed to build a wooden model of it. The name 20/25TP is not official. It was created by Janusz Magnuski analogously to nomenclature used for other Polish tanks of that period. According to different classification it could be medium tank or heavy tank.

Design

KSUS project was in two variants, assuming the usage of 75 mm anti-aircraft gun and 35 mm armor. There were also two turrets at the front of the vehicle equipped with heavy machine guns and one heavy machine gun in the main turret. Weight of the tank was 22 tonnes. The drive consisted of two petrol engines of 300 hp each. The ability to cross the ditches reached 2.5 meters, wading depth reached up to 1.2 m. The tank would have a length of 7.3 m, width 2.6 m, height 2.8 m Assumed speed of travel on the road was 45 km/h. The crew was six people.

Tank by BBTBr.Panc. had a 75 mm Bofors gun and coupled with it  40 mm Bofors L/60 cannon, three heavy machine guns, 50 mm armor, and the weight of 23 tons. The project had a engine with 500 hp. Its top speed was 40 km / h with the crew of five people. As the only one turret.

PZInż project was equipped with a 75 mm anti-aircraft gun wz.22/24, one heavy machine gun and 60 mm armor. It was also the heaviest - the weight would be 25 tons.

Operators

 - planned.

See also 

 Neubaufahrzeug, a similar German tank
 T-28, a similar Soviet tank
 Polish armaments 1939-1945

Bibliography
 Mała Encyklopedia Wojskowa, Wydawnictwo Ministerstwa Obrony Narodowej, wyd. I, W-wa 1967, T. I, str. 152
 Nowa Technika Wojskowa 9/2006

World War II medium tanks
World War II armoured fighting vehicles of Poland
Tanks of Poland